An election for President of Israel was held in the Knesset on 4 March 1998.
 
It was the first time an incumbent President of Israel  was challenged. Shaul Amor stood against Ezer Weizman, but Weizman was re-elected by a vote of 63 to 49.

Results

References

President
Presidential elections in Israel
Israel